The Big Rib River is a river in central Wisconsin.  It originates in northeastern Taylor County at Rib Lake, and flows into Marathon County where it joins the Wisconsin River. "Rib River" is a translation of the Native American name.

The Big Rib River flows through Rib Falls then to Marathon City, before it converges into the Wisconsin River at the northeast face of Rib Mountain.

The Dells of the Big Rib River, below Goodrich, are believed to be the rapids where Father René Menard disappeared in 1661, which attempting to reach a band of Huron Indians at Lake Chelsea.  He left his partner at the rapids to carry some supplies and was never seen again.

See also
List of rivers of Wisconsin

Notes

Rivers of Wisconsin
Rivers of Marathon County, Wisconsin
Rivers of Taylor County, Wisconsin